Interleukin 9, also known as IL-9, is a pleiotropic cytokine (cell signalling molecule) belonging to the group of interleukins. IL-9 is produced by variety of cells like mast cells, NKT cells, Th2, Th17, Treg, ILC2, and Th9 cells in different amounts. Among them, Th9 cells are regarded as the major CD4+ T cells that produce IL-9.

Functions 

Il-9 is a cytokine secreted by CD4+ helper cells that acts as a regulator of a variety of hematopoietic cells. This cytokine stimulates cell proliferation and prevents apoptosis. It functions through the interleukin-9 receptor (IL9R), which activates different signal transducer and activator (STAT) proteins namely STAT1, STAT3 and STAT5 and thus connects this cytokine to various biological processes. The gene encoding this cytokine has been identified as a candidate gene for asthma. Genetic studies on a mouse model of asthma demonstrated that this cytokine is a determining factor in the pathogenesis of bronchial hyperresponsiveness.

Interleukin-9 has also shown to inhibit melanoma growth in mice.

Additionally, it gives rise to the multiplication of hematologic neoplasias and also Hodgkin's lymphoma in humans but IL-9 also has antitumor properties in solid tumors, for example melanoma.

Discovery 
IL-9 was first described in the late 1980s as a member of a growing number of cytokines that had pleiotropic functions in the immune system.IL-9 remains an understudied cytokine even though it has been allocated with many biological functions. It was first purified and characterized as a T cell and mast cell growth factor and termed as P40, based on their molecular weight, or Mast cell growth-enhancing activity (MEA).The cloning and complete amino acid sequencing of P40 disclosed that it is structurally different from other T cells growth factors. So, it was named IL-9 based on its biological effects on both myeloid and lymphoid cells.

The identification and cloning was first done by Yang and colleagues as a mitogenic factor for a human megakaryoblastic leukemia. The same human cDNA was isolated again by cross-hybridization with the mouse IL-9 probe.

Gene location 
The human IL-9 gene is located on the long arm of human chromosome 5 at band 5q31-32, a region which is not found in a number of patients with acquired chromosome 5q deletion syndrome.

Protein structure 
Human IL-9 protein sequence contains 144 residues with a typical signal peptide of 18 amino acids. There is also the presence of 9 cysteines in mature polypeptide and 4  N-linked glycosylation sites.  Until recently, IL-9 was thought to be evolutionary related to  IL-7. However, we know now that IL-9  is closer to IL-2 and IL-15 than to IL-7, at both the tertiary and amino acid sequence levels.

Production 
Interleukin 33 (IL-33) induces IL-9 expression and secretion in T cells, which was confirmed by the results obtained in mice by using Human  in vitro system. Whereas the report of others confirms that TGF-β is an essential factor for IL-9 induction. For the first time (Lars Blom, Britta C. Poulsen, Bettina M. Jensen, Anker Hansen and Lars K. Poulsen published a journal online in 2011 Jul 6),indicating that TGF-β may be important for production of IL-9 but it is not only the definite requirement for IL-9 induction, since cultures with IL-33 without TGF-β have noticeably increased secretion of IL-9, suggesting an important role of IL-33, even though that the effect was not found significant on the gene level.

IL-9 expression 
The analysis of IL-9 expression in different types of tumours such as Large cell anaplastic lymphoma (LCAL) and Hodgkin's Disease (HD) by Northern blot analysis and in situ hybridization has showed that IL-9 is not involved as an autocrine growth factor in the pathogenesis of most B and T-cell lymphomas, but it may have a part in HD and LCAL autocrine growth.

The further investigation could be done to conclude another probability, that, the in vivo overexpression of IL-9 might show the unique symptoms related to eosinophilia which was recently reported for Interleukin 5 positive cases of HD.

IL-9 was found to be the first physiological stimulus triggering BCL3 expression in T cells and mast cells by the analysis done in mouse.

References

Further reading 

 
 
 
 
 
 
 
 
 
 
 
 
 
 
 
 
 
 
 

Interleukins